"Something's Going On" is the third and final single by rock band A released from their album Hi-Fi Serious. It reached number 51 in the UK Singles Chart and was C listed by BBC Radio One. It was also used to advertise Tony Hawk's video game Pro Skater 4. It is track 2 on the album, Hi-Fi Serious. A live version appears on the live album Rockin' Like Dokken. It is used in the What's New, Scooby-Doo? episode "Farmed and Dangerous", and the video game, Surf's Up.

The promotional video for "Something's Going On" features the band performing in a wind tunnel, before the force of the wind shears away the metal walls around them.

Track listing
CD 1
"Something's Going On" - 3:02
"Rock" - 4:05
"Human Condition" - 4:01
"Something's Going On" (video)

CD 2
"Something's Going On" - 3:02
"Sorry But..." - 4:03
"Just Like Paradise" (David Lee Roth cover) - 4:06
"Just Like Paradise" (film)

Vinyl
"Something's Going On" - 3:02
"Just Like Paradise" (David Lee Roth cover) - 4:06

A (band) songs
2002 singles
Songs written by Jason Perry (singer)